CRQ may refer to:
 Air Creebec's ICAO designator
 McClellan–Palomar Airport's FAA location identifier
 :CRQ, a software product for CueCat
 Caravelas Airport's IATA code
 Change Request, in Information Technology, a customer or user's request to change hardware or software.
 Chronic Respiratory Questionnaire
 Continuous Repeat Request
 Customer Relationship Quality, a measure of customer retention from Deep-Insight
 Cross-recurrence quantification
 Central Research Question
 Classical Recordings Quarterly, a quarterly British magazine devoted to vintage recordings of classical music.